William Henry Pearson (1849–1923) was an English bryologist, known as an outstanding expert on British liverworts (hepatics).

After secondary education, William Henry Pearson was employed by a Manchester company of yarn agents. After some years, he went into business for himself in the yarn trade. When he was in his late thirties and early forties, he lived in Eccles, Greater Manchester. There he became a friend of Benjamin Carrington and studied botany in some of the classes taught by Carrington. Richard Spruce encouraged Pearson to specialise in bryology.

Pearson studied not only the British hepatics, but also those of Australia, New Zealand, and Canada. He published articles in the Journal of Botany, The Naturalist, and The Rucksack Club Journal. He was a member of several natural history societies (including the Rucksack Club) and the Manchester Museum Committee.

Pearson married Annie Dearden in 1882. They had four daughters, Lucy Carrington (1883–1971), Phyllis Marion (1885–1972), Hilda Hewitson (1887–1918), and Annie Theodora (1892–1971). Lucy Carrington Pearson married Paul Wertheim and became famous as Lucy Wertheim, an art gallery owner, art patron, and author.

Selected publications

References

1849 births
1923 deaths
19th-century British botanists
20th-century British botanists
Bryologists